Goodwin Cooke is a Professor of Practice Emeritus in International Relations at Maxwell School of Citizenship and Public Affairs of Syracuse University and was a U.S. foreign service officer who served as ambassador to the Central African Republic (October 11, 1978 – July 13, 1980).

Education
 B.A., Harvard University, 1953, major math and physics

Career
After graduation, Cooke joined the Marines and served as an engineer officer abroad. When he left the Corps, he worked as a manager in a manufacturing firm before taking a 50% pay cut to work in Washington, D.C.

References

Harvard College alumni
Syracuse University faculty
Ambassadors of the United States to the Central African Republic
Year of birth missing (living people)
Living people
20th-century American diplomats